Mecyclothorax globosoides is a species of ground beetle in the subfamily Psydrinae. It was described by Perrault in 1989.

References

globosoides
Beetles described in 1989